Johan Edvard (Eetu) Salin (18 March 1866 – 6 April 1919) was a Finnish shoemaker, journalist and politician, born in Asikkala. He was a member of the Parliament of Finland from 1909 to 1910 and again from 1917 to 1918, representing the Social Democratic Party of Finland (SDP). In 1918 he was imprisoned for having sided with the Reds during the Finnish Civil War. He died in prison in Helsinki the next year. He is buried in the Hietaniemi Cemetery in Helsinki.

References

1866 births
1919 deaths
People from Asikkala
People from Häme Province (Grand Duchy of Finland)
Social Democratic Party of Finland politicians
Members of the Parliament of Finland (1909–10)
Members of the Parliament of Finland (1917–19)
People of the Finnish Civil War (Red side)
Prisoners who died in Finnish detention
Burials at Hietaniemi Cemetery